Indrapalem is a village situated in East Godavari district in Kakinada Rural, in Andhra Pradesh State.

References

Villages in East Godavari district